Roman Grigorievich Maev (Russian: Роман Григорьевич Маев), (born 1945 in Moscow) is a Canadian professor of physics at the University of Windsor (Windsor, Ontario), distinguished university professor, the Foreign Member of the Russian Academy of Sciences (RAS) (2019), full professor in physics (2005), Dr. Sc. (2002), Ph. D. (1973). Dr. Maev is the founding director of the Institute for Diagnostic Imaging Research at the University of Windsor.

Dr. Maev is one of Canada's prominent solid-state physicists and educators and is a recognized expert in physical acoustics, ultrasonic and nonlinear acoustical imaging, nanostructured advanced materials and biomaterials, additive manufacturing, instrumentations for medical diagnostics, and art and culture heritage analysis.

Dr. Maev is also the founding President and CEO of Tessonics Group, a global leader specializing in design, development and production of ultrasonic equipment for industrial and medical applications. It was founded in 2003 and currently Tessonics Group is operating through its independently functioning branches in twelve countries around the world with the headquarters located in Windsor, Canada.

Since 2008, Dr. Maev has been serving as Honorary Consul of the Russian Federation in Windsor (Canada, Ontario).

Early life and education
Dr. Maev earned his M.Sc. Degree with Red Diploma in theoretical nuclear physics from the National Research Nuclear University MEPhI (Moscow Engineering Physics Institute) in 1969. In 1972, he was awarded from the National Young Scientist Society for the best results in theoretical physics. In 1973,  Dr. Maev received his Ph.D. in the theory of semiconductors from the P.N. Lebedev Physical Institute of the USSR Academy of Sciences. In 2002, Dr. Maev defended his Dr. Sci. Degree with the Title: “Methods of Acoustic Microscopy for Investigation of Microstructure, Physical and Chemical Properties of Materials” and was granted by Dr. Sc. Diploma from the Russian Academy of Sciences. In 2005, the Russian Federation Government granted Dr. Maev with an official certificate of a full professorship in Physics in the field “Scientific Equipment and Methods for Experimental Physics”.

Scientific and academic career
In 1978, Maev was appointed as head of the Laboratory for Biophysical Introscopy at the Institute of Chemical Physics of the USSR Academy of Sciences, and in 1984, he began to serve as acting chairholder of the Biomedical Physics Chair at the Moscow Institute of Physics and Technology. In 1987, Dr. Maev established and became founding director of the Acoustic Microscopy Center at the USSR Academy of Sciences. In 1990, he received a fellowship from the USA—USSR Gore-Chernomyrdin Commission, and as a result took a special series of courses at the Harvard Business School in Boston, USA.

In  1994, Maev moved to Canada through an intergovernmental exchange program between Canada and Russia. In 1995, Dr. Maev was appointed a Full Faculty Professor in the Department of Physics at the University of Windsor (Windsor, Canada), and in 2002, he became a Chairholder of the DaimlerChrysler Industrial Research Chair. Since beginning his research activity in Canada, which has been ongoing since 1995, Maev has received support for his research from various industrial partners and government agencies with grants totaling over $46 million.

Throughout his academic career Dr. Maev has been an adjunct professor at Oxford University, Johns Hopkins University, McGill University and the University of Michigan, in addition to being a member of the Brockhouse Materials Research Institute at McMaster University. He has held visiting professorships at the NIST, Rochester University, the University of Illinois at Urbana-Champaign, the University of California, Technische Universität München, Bundeswehr University, Kyoto University, Hefei University, Université Paris VI, Aberdeen University and University of Palermo. He is currently adjunct professor at the University of Toronto, Wayne State University and the Wroclaw Polytechnic.

Maev currently serves as a member of the editorial advisory board of the ASNT Journal of Research in Non-destructive Evaluation of the BINDT Journal "Insight". Throughout several years he has also served as guest editor of special issues of various journals.  Maev is a Fellow of IEEE (bestowed IEEE Distinguished Lecturer), Fellow of BINDT, Fellow of CINDE, Fellow of RSNTTD.  Maev has been on the Nano Ontario Board of Directors since 2012, member of the organizing and program committees of various international conferences and symposiums, such as IEEE UFFC, SPIE Medical Imaging, NDE in Art Analyses, ASNT, CINDE, RSNTTD Conferences, etc.

Awards
Maev is the recipient of numerous national and international awards for his innovations, research discoveries, and inventions. In 1988, in recognition of his contribution to the development of the ultrasound technique, Dr. Maev was awarded the Pioneer Award by the American Institute of Ultrasound in Medicine. In 1989, he was awarded the Centenary Ernst Abbe Medal from the World Microscopical Society. In 2001, he received a Letter of Recognition for Research Excellence from the Deputy Prime Minister of Canada. In 2001, 2002, and 2006, he received awards for outstanding research and development from the DaimlerChrysler Corporation. From 2001 to present, the University of Windsor has granted him various awards in recognition of research and scholarship excellence. In 2003, Dr. Maev received the Canada Innovation Summit Award in Recognition of Contribution to New Knowledge and Technical Innovation. In 2007, he received the Ontario Premier's Catalyst Award for the Start Up Company with the Best Innovation. In the same year, he was awarded the Canadian Association of Physicists Gold Medal for Outstanding Achievement in Industrial and Applied Physics.

In 2009, he was elected as an IEEE Fellow and in 2010 he was elected as a full member of the A. M. Prokhorov Russian Academy of Engineering Sciences. In 2011, he received the William Gardner Award at the 50th Annual Conference of the British Institute of Non-Destructive Testing. In 2012, Maev was bestowed the Research Award for Sustained Excellence by the American Society for Non-destructive Testing. The same year Dr. Maev was honoured with the Russian Foreign Affair Order for his contribution into Canadian-Russian relations. In 2014 (awarded in 2015), he was granted the Best Paper Award from the Canadian Journal of Physics, for the paper “A Review of Imaging Methods in Analysis of Works of Art: Thermographic Imaging Method in Art Analysis”. In 2015–16, Dr. Maev received the IEEE Distinguished Lecturer Award. The American Society for Non-destructive Testing awarded him the ASNT Outstanding Paper in 2016 for “Grain Size Measurements of Copper Spot Welding Caps via Ultrasonic Attenuation and Scattering Experiments”. In 2017, Dr. Maev was honoured with the Russian Order of Friendship for his long-term great contribution into international relations. In 2019, he was conferred the BINDT Roy Sharpe Award in recognition for his outstanding contribution to the global NDT Community. In 2019, he was elected to the Russian Academy of Sciences and received the prestigious title of the Academician.

Principal research contributions
In 1978, Maev was appointed as a head of the Laboratory of Biophysical Introscopy of the Institute of Chemical Physics of the Russian Academy of Sciences and in 1979, he designed and built the first high resolution (500 MHz) transmission-mode scanning acoustic microscope. Dr. R. Maev together with Dr. A. Atalar (Stanford Univ.) and Dr. A. Briggs (Oxford Univ.) in 1980 was invited to be consultors for Dr. M. Hoppe’s group at the Ernst Leitz Wetzlar, GmbH (Germany) to build first commercial SAM ELSAM with the broad frequency range from 100 MHz up to ultra high  1.8 GHz. From 1984 to 1990, Dr. Maev with the colleagues from his Lab. developed the theory to determine the amplitude of acoustic waves occurring in transmission-mode acoustic microscopy and derived new quantitative amplitude-based methods for more accurate material characterisation. During the same period his Lab. designed and built a new portable SAM systems which was implemented in a few research institutions in Russia, Ukraine, Latvia, China and Germany. Later, in 2001, Dr. Maev developed a novel handheld high-frequency (up to 100 MHz) ultrasonic imaging system for the characterization of subsurface and bulk structures of advanced materials, such as metals and alloys, ceramics, composites and polymers and, recently, for subsurface imaging of hard and soft tissues.

Over the course of his career, Dr. Maev has established world-renowned research schools, first in Russia, he founded an Acoustic Microscopy Center in Moscow, and later on in Canada, he founded the Institute for Diagnostic Imaging Research in Windsor, Ontario. He has mentored over 210 graduate and undergraduate students, many of whom have gone on to leadership positions in academic and the private sectors worldwide.

Publications and patents
The diverse range of research directions encompassed by Dr. Roman Maev reflected through his publications and patents. As of 2020, he has published a total of 592 peer-reviewed items, including 23 books and chapters in books, 141 articles, 388 refereed conference proceedings, 46 patents issued and/or filed.

Personal life
Maev is married to Russian-Canadian physicist Dr. Elena Maeva. The couple met when Maeva was studying for her doctoral degree. They reside in Windsor, Ontario with their daughter and son.

References

1945 births
Living people
Canadian physicists
Russian physicists
Scientists from Moscow
Academic staff of the Moscow Institute of Physics and Technology
Academic staff of University of Windsor
Foreign Members of the Russian Academy of Sciences
University of Michigan people
Soviet physicists